Daniel S. Major House is a historic home located at Lawrenceburg, Dearborn County, Indiana.  It was built between 1857 and 1860, and is a two-story, rectangular, Italianate style brick dwelling. It has an ashlar stone foundation, low hipped roof, polygonal bay windows, and a two-story service wing.

It was added to the National Register of Historic Places in 2003.

References

Houses on the National Register of Historic Places in Indiana
Italianate architecture in Indiana
Houses completed in 1860
Houses in Dearborn County, Indiana
National Register of Historic Places in Dearborn County, Indiana
1860 establishments in Indiana